Nadezhda Alexandrovna Teffi (Saint Petersburg – 6 October 1952, Paris) was a Russian humorist writer. Together with Arkady Averchenko she was one of the prominent authors of the magazine Novyi Satirikon.

Biography
Teffi was born as Nadezhda Lokhvitskaya into a family of gentry. Her year of birth is variously reported in the range 1871–1876. Her father, Alexander Vladimirovich Lokhvitsky, a lawyer and scholar, was prominent in Saint Petersburg society. Her mother, Varvara Alexandrovna Goyer, was of French descent, a lover of poetry, and familiar with Russian and European literature. Teffi was first introduced to literature when, as a young girl, she read Childhood and Boyhood by Leo Tolstoy, and the fiction of Alexander Pushkin. Her own first published poetry appeared in the journal The North in 1901 under her full name. In 1905 her first story, The Day Has Passed, was published in the journal The Fields, also under her full name. It had been written in 1904 and first submitted to the journal God's World, which had turned it down. In the years surrounding the Russian Revolution of 1905 she published stories with political overtones against the Tsarist government.

In an answer to a questionnaire given to writers in 1911, Teffi said the following about her early literary work:

Teffi married Vladislav Buchinsky, a Polish lawyer and judge, but they separated in 1900. They had two daughters and a son together. She was a contributor to the first Bolshevik journal The New Life, whose editorial board included writers like Maxim Gorky and Zinaida Gippius. Her best work appeared in Satiricon magazine and the popular journal Russkoye Slovo (Russian Word). In Russia she published many collections of poetry and short stories, and a number of one-act plays. She first used the pseudonym "Teffi" with the publication in 1907 of her one-act play The Woman Question. She provided two separate explanations of the name; that it was suggested to her in relation to a friend whose servant called him "Steffi", or that it came from the English rhyme "Taffy was a Welshman/Taffy was a thief."

Initially a supporter of the October Revolution, she rapidly became disenchanted with the Bolsheviks, going so far as to refer to Lenin as "the mother-in-law of the Russian Revolution". In 1918 she left St Petersburg, and on the pretext of a theatrical tour, travelled with a group of actors across Russia and Ukraine, eventually reaching Istanbul. In 1920, she settled in Paris and began publishing her works in the Russian newspapers there. In exile, she wrote a vivid account of her escape from the Soviet Union through the chaos of the Russia Civil War (Memories, 1928–1930) and published several collections of short stories and poems and her only novel An Adventure Novel (1932). The critic Anastasiya Chebotarevskaya compared Teffi's stories, which she said were "highly benevolent in their elegiac tone and profoundly humanitarian in their attitudes", to the best stories by Anton Chekhov. Teffi is buried at Sainte-Geneviève-des-Bois Russian Cemetery in France.

In 2018, Edythe Haber's biography of Teffi was published, the first such work in any language.

English translations
A Modest Talent and Diamond Dust (one-act plays), and Talent (story), from A Russian Cultural Revival, University of Tennessee Press, 1981.
All About Love (story collection), Ardis Publishers, 1985.
The Woman Question (one-act play) and Walled Up (story), from An Anthology of Russian Women's Writing, Oxford, 1994.Time (story), from The Portable Twentieth Century Reader, Penguin Classics, 2003.Love and A Family Journey (stories), from Russian Stories from Pushkin to Buida, Penguin Classics, 2005.When the Crayfish Whistled: A Christmas Horror, A Little Fairy Tale, Baba Yaga (text of a picture book), The Dog, and  Baba Yaga (essay), from Russian Magic Tales from Pushkin to Platonov, Penguin Classics, 2012.Subtly Worded (stories), Pushkin Press, 2014; translated by Robert and Elizabeth Chandler, Anne-Marie Jackson and others.Tolstoy, Rasputin, Others, and Me: The best of Teffi (story collection), New York Review Books, 2016: published simultaneously in the UK by Pushkin Press as Rasputin and Other Ironies; translated by Robert and Elizabeth Chandler, Anne-Marie Jackson and others..Memories: From Moscow to the Black Sea (memoir of 1918-20 journey to exile), New York Review Books, 2016: published simultaneously in the UK by Pushkin Press; translated by Robert and Elizabeth Chandler, Anne-Marie Jackson, Irina Steinberg and others.Other Worlds: Peasants, Pilgrims, Spirits, Saints (story collection), New York Review Books, 2021: published simultaneously in the UK by Pushkin Press (August 2021); translated by Robert and Elizabeth Chandler, Anne-Marie Jackson and others.

German translations
Teffy alias Nadeshda Lochwizkaja: Champagner aus Teetassen : meine letzten Tage in Russland, Aus dem Russ. von Ganna-Maria Braungardt, Berlin : Aufbau, 2014, 

References

External links
Works by Teffi on Lib.ru internet library 
Всеобщая история, обработанная «Сатириконом» – World history processed by Satiricon by Teffi, Averchenko, D'Or and others 
, song by Larisa Novoseltseva on poem by Teffi
Article about Teffi's short story collection The Witch (Ved'ma, 1936'') https://www.litencyc.com/php/sworks.php?rec=true&UID=38906

Writers from Saint Petersburg
Burials at Sainte-Geneviève-des-Bois Russian Cemetery
White Russian emigrants to France
Pseudonymous women writers
1872 births
1952 deaths
Novelists from the Russian Empire
Memoirists from the Russian Empire
Women memoirists
Women writers from the Russian Empire
Poets from the Russian Empire
Dramatists and playwrights from the Russian Empire
Women dramatists and playwrights
Short story writers from the Russian Empire
Women humorists
20th-century Russian women writers
20th-century pseudonymous writers